West Morris High School may refer to:

West Morris Central High School in Washington Township, Morris County, New Jersey
West Morris Mendham High School in Mendham Borough, Morris County, New Jersey